The 1880 general election in Ireland marked the beginning both of the dominance of the Irish Parliamentary Party in Irish politics and of Charles Stewart Parnell's dominance within the Party.

The party won 62 of the 103 Irish parliamentary seats. 2 later defected to the Liberals. Parnell was presumed to have had the support of 25 of the MPs. When the Parliamentary Party reassembled in Westminster Parnell was elected session chairman of the party in place of William Shaw.

The IPP would not drop below the number of seats won in the 1880 election again until the 1918 general election, when it experienced an electoral wipeout at the hands of Sinn Féin.

Results

See also
 History of Ireland (1801–1923)

References

Sources
 
 

1880
Ireland
March 1880 events
April 1880 events
1880 elections in Ireland